Dorchester was a station on the Jackson Park branch of the Chicago "L". The station opened on April 23, 1893 and closed on January 13, 1973, as part of a group of budget-related CTA station closings. Dorchester was scheduled to be the new terminal of the Jackson Park Branch, but the CTA decided to make Cottage Grove the new terminal, because the Reverend Arthur Brazier and other Woodlawn residents said the 'L' structure over East 63rd Street would further blight Woodlawn and prevent redevelopment.

References

External links 
 Dorchester station page at Chicago-L.org
 The site of Dorchester seen in a home movie from the 1970s or early 1980s

Defunct Chicago "L" stations
Railway stations in the United States opened in 1893
Railway stations closed in 1973
1893 establishments in Illinois
1973 disestablishments in Illinois
Former North Shore Line stations